Tibor Parák is a Hungarian geologist known for his mineral explorations and academic contributions to economic geology. Parák arrived to Sweden from 
Soviet-occupied Hungary as a refugee in 1956. He was active at LKAB as chief geologist. He proposed a sedimentary origin for the iron ore of Kiruna and investigated on connection between the ore districts of Skelleftefältet and Kirunafältet.

Back in the 1970s Parák thought the rare-earth elements in Kirunas gangue minerals would be economically valuable in the future.

References

"Järnmannen" : en geologs dagbok   

 

Economic geologists
Hungarian emigrants to Sweden
20th-century Swedish geologists
Hungarian geologists